Galeotto Graziani, O.Cam. (1450(?) – 15 April 1522), was an Italian monk of the Camaldolese Order and Roman Catholic prelate who served as the first Bishop of Sansepolcro (1520–1522).

Biography
Galeotto Graziani, born possibly sometime about 1450, became a monk of the Camaldolese Abbey of Sansepolcro in Tuscany, an abbey nullius, where he was ordained a priest. He was elected abbot of the community in 1509.

On 17 September 1520, the abbey was suppressed by Pope Leo X and its territory was made a part of the new Diocese of Sansepolcro. At that time, the pope appointed Graziani to be the first Bishop of Sansepolcro, for which he was consecrated a bishop on 3 January of the following year. He served in this office until his death on 15 April 1522.

References 

15th-century births
1522 deaths
Benedictine abbots
16th-century Italian Roman Catholic bishops
Bishops appointed by Pope Leo X
Camaldolese bishops